Antrim Borough Council was the local authority of Antrim in Northern Ireland. It merged with Newtownabbey Borough Council on 1 April 2015 under local government reorganisation in Northern Ireland to become Antrim and Newtownabbey Borough Council.

Members
Antrim Borough Council was sub-divided into three electoral areas: Antrim South-East, Antrim North-West and Antrim Town, from which 19 members were elected. In the last election to the former Council in February 2011, the following political parties were represented: 5 Democratic Unionist Party (DUP), 5 Ulster Unionist Party (UUP), 3 Sinn Féin, 3 Alliance Party, 2 Social Democratic and Labour Party and 1 Traditional Unionist Voice. Elections were held every four years using the proportional representation system.

Mayor
A mayor and deputy mayor were elected from among the councillors at the borough council's annual meeting in June. For the civic year 2012/2013 the Mayor of Antrim was Roy Thompson (DUP) and the Deputy Mayor was Roderick Swann (UUP).

Population
The area covered by Antrim Borough Council had a population of 53,428 residents according to the 2011 Northern Ireland census.

References

District councils of Northern Ireland, 1973–2015
Politics of County Antrim